Kanal 24 may refer to:
24 Kanal, a Ukrainian TV channel
24 (Turkey), a Turkish TV channel called Kanal 24 in Turkish
Radio Norge, formerly Kanal 24, a Norwegian radio

See also
 Channel 24 (disambiguation)
 24 (disambiguation)